In human anatomy, plantar interossei muscles are three muscles located between the metatarsal bones in the foot.

Structure
The three plantar interosseous muscles are unipennate, as opposed to the bipennate structure of dorsal interosseous muscles, and originate on a single metatarsal bone. The three muscles originate on the medial aspect of metatarsals III-V. The muscles cross the metatarsophalangeal joint of toes III-V so the insertions correspond with the origin and there is no crossing between toes.

The muscles then continue distally along the foot and insert in the proximal phalanges III-V. The muscles cross the metatarsophalangeal joint of toes III-V so the insertions correspond with the origin and there is no crossing between toes.

Innervation 
All three plantar interosseous muscles are innervated by the lateral plantar nerve. The lateral plantar nerve is a branch from the tibial nerve, which originally branches off the sciatic nerve from the sacral plexus.

Function
Since the intersseous muscles cross on the metatarsophalangeal joint, then they act on that specific joint and cause adduction of toes III, IV, and V.

Adduction itself is not of extreme importance to the toes, but these muscles work together with the dorsal interosseous muscles in flexion of the foot. They also work together to strengthen the metatarsal arch.

Additional images

See also
 Interosseous muscles of the hand
 Dorsal interossei of the hand
 Palmar interossei
 Interosseous muscles of the foot
 Dorsal interossei of the foot

References

External links
 PTCentral

Foot muscles
Muscles of the lower limb